Micreremites is a genus of moths of the family Noctuidae.

Species
Micreremites rasalis Warren, 1891

References
Natural History Museum Lepidoptera genus database

Calpinae